Nicky Hirst (born 27 February 1963, Nottingham) is an English artist. She was the official artist of the 2019 United Kingdom general election.

Further reading 
 Cross, Andrew. "Hirst, Nicky." In Grove Art Online. Oxford Art Online, (accessed February 11, 2012; subscription required).

External links 

 Entry for Nicky Hirst on the Union List of Artist Names
 Artist's official site
 Representing Gallery

English installation artists
English sculptors
Artists from Nottingham
English women sculptors
1963 births
Living people
21st-century British women artists
21st-century English women
21st-century English people